Akrimota Thermal Power Station is a lignite-based thermal power plant located in village Nanichher in  Lakhpat Taluka, Kutch District, Gujarat. The power plant is run by state-owned Gujarat Mineral Development Corporation.

Capacity
The power plant has an installed capacity of 250 MW (2x125 MW).

References 

Coal-fired power stations in Gujarat
Kutch district
2005 establishments in Gujarat
Energy infrastructure completed in 2005